The 2010 Connecticut attorney general election was held on Tuesday, November 2, 2010, to elect the 24th attorney general of the state of Connecticut. Five-term incumbent attorney general Richard Blumenthal declined to seek re-election in 2010, instead opting to run for Connecticut's open U.S. Senate seat held by the retiring Christopher Dodd. Blumenthal's decision not to seek a sixth term set-up the first open race for attorney general in the state since Blumenthal's election in 1990.

At their May 2010 state convention, Democratic candidate George Jepsen won the endorsement of his party outright and did not face a primary challenger. The Republican candidate, Martha Dean, secured her party's nomination via a primary election defeat of Ross Garber on August 10.

Candidates

Democratic

Announced
Former State Senate Majority Leader George Jepsen

Declined
Incumbent attorney general Richard Blumenthal
Waterbury Mayor Michael Jarjura
State Representative Cameron Staples

Disqualified
Secretary of the State Susan Bysiewicz

Primary polling

Republican

Announced
 Martha Dean, attorney from Avon and 2002 Republican attorney general nominee
 Ross Garber, attorney from Glastonbury and 2002 Republican nominee for state treasurer
 Kie Westby, attorney from Southbury
 State Representative Arthur O'Neill of Southbury

Declined
Mayor Jason L. McCoy from Vernon, who later took his name out of consideration at the convention and nominated Ross Garber
State Senator Andrew Roraback
John Pavia, attorney from Easton, originally intended to seek the nomination, however, took his name out of consideration prior to the state convention

Primary polling

Other parties
Green Party: Stephen Fournier

Early campaign
On January 6, 2010, five-term Connecticut United States Senator Christopher Dodd announced that he would not seek re-election in 2010. On this same day, Richard Blumenthal, the 23rd and incumbent state attorney general, announced that he would not run for re-election for the state's top legal office and would instead seek the Democratic nomination for Dodd's Senate seat. Blumenthal had previously been considered a likely Democratic candidate for the 2012 Senate race, when incumbent Independent Democrat Joe Lieberman's seat is next up.

Blumenthal's decision not to seek re-election set-up the first open race for attorney general in the state since his election in 1990.

A week after Blumenthal's announcement, on January 13, 2010, Democratic Secretary of the State Susan Bysiewicz announced that she would run for her party's nomination for attorney general. Bysiewicz had previously declined seeking re-election to the Secretary of the State's office to instead run in the 2010 gubernatorial election, but dropped her candidacy when she switched to run for attorney general.

There was controversy about whether Bysiewicz was legally qualified to run for attorney general in Connecticut, as state law requires the attorney general to be "an attorney of law of at least 10 years' active practice" in the state. Bysiewicz worked at New York law firm White and Case for two years, then in Connecticut at Robinson and Cole from 1988 to 1992 and Aetna Insurance from 1992 to 1994, totaling six years of Connecticut practice. Her campaign stated that Bysiewicz was qualified to hold the attorney general position because her service as Secretary of the State counted toward the 10-year requirement, although she "acknowledged during a [March 31, 2010] deposition that she has virtually no experience as a litigator and has never argued a case before a judge."

On May 5, 2010, Superior Court Judge Michael Sheldon ruled that Bysiewicz was legally qualified to run for state attorney general. However, when the case reached the Connecticut Supreme Court on May 18, Justice Flemming L. Norcott, Jr. handed down the court's 7-0 unanimous ruling that Bysiewicz failed to meet the requirements of General Statutes Section 3–124, which outlines the qualifications for state attorney general. As a consequence, Bysiewicz could not run for attorney general in 2010, which left former State Senator George Jepsen the sole remaining Democratic candidate in the race.

Nominations
George Jepsen won the Democratic nomination by acclamation at the party's state convention held on May 22, 2010.

Four Republicans contested their party's nomination at their May 22 state convention, with the convention endorsing Martha Dean. Ross Garber, whose sister-in-law is Democrat Susan Bysiewicz, attracted sufficient support to qualify for an August 10, 2010 primary and challenged Dean for the nomination. Dean then defeated Garber in the GOP primary.

Republican primary

General election

Debates
On September 23, 2010, Martha Dean and George Jepsen participated in a debate sponsored by the Connecticut Law Tribune and the University of Connecticut School of Law in Hartford. In the debate, Dean stated that "ending the job-killing practices of the attorney general and restoring common sense to the office of attorney general" were priorities in the election, and that the size of the office and the scope of lawsuits filed by it should be reduced. Jepsen argued that Dean's desire to reduce the office's role might be counterproductive, and criticized her for wishing to join about 20 other states in challenging the federal government on the federal healthcare reforms enacted earlier in the year.

Dean and Jepsen met again for a second debate on October 11 at the Quinnipiac University School of Law in Hamden.

Polling

Martha Dean lawsuit
Claiming that Jepsen was not qualified to hold office, Dean filed a lawsuit on October 26 requesting the courts remove Jepsen from the following week's ballot. Dean's rationale for bringing the lawsuit forward was based on Jepsen's admission that he did not have a background in litigation and the fact that he lacked admission to argue cases before the U.S. Court of Appeals for the Second Circuit and the U.S. Supreme Court. One day after the election, on November 3, Superior Court judge Julia Aurigemma granted a dismissal of the lawsuit, stating in her decision that, "In this case, there is no statutory authority that authorizes [Dean] to bring her ... action prior to the election." Reacting to the decision, Dean said that the campaign was "evaluating the decision and our options and will take whatever steps are necessary to ensure that Connecticut has an attorney general who is fully qualified to vigorously represent the state's interests in court." In his reaction, Jepsen said that the lawsuit had been a "publicity stunt" and that he "was never worried about the merits of the case in court."

Results

References

External links
Martha Dean for Attorney General
Stephen Fournier for Attorney General
George Jepsen for Attorney General

attorney
Connecticut
2010